Sympistis osiris is a moth of the family Noctuidae first described by James T. Troubridge in 2008. It is found in New Mexico.

The wingspan is 30–34 mm.

References

osiris
Moths described in 2008